Ahmedguda formally known as Bandlagudem is a locality in Dammaiguda Municipality in Medchal district in Telangana, India. Earlier (Before 2010) It was Hamlet Village in  Naagram Village then later burificated as a Separate Gram Panchayat after its merger with Dammaiguda to become Dammaiguda Municipality. It falls under Keesara mandal.

There is Ahmadguda masjid Mosque in Ahmadguda.

Believer's church is also located in Ahmadguda.

The Prajay sai colony,  VRR colony,  KSR township are also located in Ahmadguda.

Osman tent house is the oldest shop in Ahmadguda.

References

Villages in Ranga Reddy district